The Montserrat skink (Mabuya montserratae) is a species of skink found in Montserrat.

References

Mabuya
Reptiles described in 2012
Endemic fauna of Montserrat
Reptiles of Montserrat
Taxa named by Stephen Blair Hedges
Taxa named by Caitlin E. Conn